Acanthospermum humile is a species of plants in the family Asteraceae. It is native to the West Indies but naturalized in parts of South America, Central America, and North America.

References

External links
 
 

humile
Flora of the Caribbean
Plants described in 1788
Flora without expected TNC conservation status